SBS 6 was a geostationary communications satellite designed and manufactured by Hughes (now Boeing) on the HS-393 platform. It was originally ordered by Satellite Business Systems, which later sold it to Hughes Communications and was last used by Intelsat. It had a Ku band payload and operated on the 95°W longitude.

Satellite description
The spacecraft was designed and manufactured by Hughes on the HS-393 satellite bus.

With its solar panels fully extended it spanned . Its power system generated approximately 2,350 Watts of power thanks to two cylindrical solar panels. It also had a two 38Ah NiH2 batteries. These panels used K7 and K4-3/4 solar cells and were more than twice the number than on the HS-376.

It also used two axial and four radial  bipropellant thrusters for station keeping and attitude control. It included enough propellant for orbit circularization and 8 years of operation.

Its payload was composed of a  multi horn antenna by thirty 45 MHz Ku band transponders, of which 19 were active and 11 spares. It had a total active bandwidth of 855 MHz. The Ku band transponders had a TWTA output power of 41 Watts. It also had an omnidirectional command and telemetry antenna.

History
In 1985 Satellite Business Systems decided to order a more powerful satellite than the HS-376 based previous satellites. Thus, it ordered the HS-393 based SBS 6 from Hughes, becoming the first customer of the platform.

On October 12, 1990, SBS 6 was finally launched by an Ariane 44L from Kourou ELA-2 at 22:58 UTC.

In April 2009, SBS 6 finally decommissioned and put on a graveyard orbit.

References

Communications satellites
Communications satellites in geostationary orbit
Spacecraft launched in 1990
Satellites using the HS-393 bus